A Woman's Triumph is a lost 1914 silent film drama directed by J. Searle Dawley and starring Laura Sawyer. It was produced by Daniel Frohman and Adolph Zukor  and based on an 1818 story The Heart of Midlothian by Sir Walter Scott.

A rival British film The Heart of Midlothian was released in April 1914.

Cast
Laura Sawyer as Jeanie Deans
Betty Harte as Effie Deans
George Moss as David Deans
Hal Clarendon as Georgie Robertson
Wellington Playter as Reuben Butler
Emily Calloway as Madge Wildfire
Helen Aubrey as Dame Murdockson

References

External links
 A Woman's Triumph at IMDb.com

1914 films
American silent feature films
Lost American films
Films based on British novels
Films directed by J. Searle Dawley
Famous Players-Lasky films
Films based on works by Walter Scott
American black-and-white films
Silent American drama films
1914 drama films
1914 lost films
Lost drama films
1910s American films